Rune Bertil Nordenstam (born 1936) is a Swedish botanist and professor emeritus at the Swedish Museum of Natural History in the Department of Phanerogamic Botany. 
He has worked with Colchicaceae, Senecioneae 
and Calenduleae,
was the editor of Compositae Newsletter newsletter since 1990, and is a Tribal Coordinator for The International Compositae Alliance with responsibility for the tribes Calenduleae and Senecioneae.

He has done field work in Greece, Sweden, Turkey, Mongolia, Egypt, Namibia. This botanist is denoted by the author abbreviation B.Nord. when citing a botanical name.

In 2006, botanist Roger Lundin published Nordenstamia, a genus of flowering plants from South America, belonging to the family Asteraceae and named in Nordenstam's honour.

Abbreviation

References

External links

Botanists with author abbreviations
Living people
1936 births
Botanists active in Africa
Swedish botanists
Members of the Royal Swedish Academy of Sciences